"Doncha?" is a song written by Walt Aldridge, and recorded by American country music artist T. G. Sheppard.  It was released in September 1985 as the second single from the album Livin' on the Edge.  The song reached #8 on the Billboard Hot Country Singles & Tracks chart.

Chart performance

References

1985 singles
T. G. Sheppard songs
Songs written by Walt Aldridge
Columbia Records singles
1985 songs